Carminatia alvarezii is a Mexican species of annual plants in the family Asteraceae.

Carminatia alvarezii is found in  San Luis Potosí, Querétaro, Puebla, Oaxaca, México State,  and Hidalgo.

References

External links
Photo of herbarium specimen collected in Guerrero

Eupatorieae
Plants described in 1987
Flora of Mexico